Madan-e Sughan (also Romanized as Maʿdan-e Şūghān; also known as Maʿdan-e Şūqān) is a village in Soghan Rural District, Soghan District, Arzuiyeh County, Kerman Province, Iran. At the 2006 census, its population was 496, in 88 families.

References 

Populated places in Arzuiyeh County